Scaphidium quadriguttatum is a species of shining fungus beetle in the family Staphylinidae.

References

Further reading

 

Staphylinidae
Articles created by Qbugbot